Governor Stuart may refer to:

Edwin Sydney Stuart (1853–1937), 24th Governor of Pennsylvania
Henry Carter Stuart (1855–1933), 47th Governor of Virginia
James Stuart (British Army officer, born 1741) (1741–1815), 2nd Military Governor of British Ceylon from 1796 to 1797
Patrick Stuart (British Army officer, born 1777) (1777–1855), Governor of Malta 1843–47

See also
Governor Stewart (disambiguation)